Bill Elgart or Billy Elgart (born November 9, 1942, Cambridge, Massachusetts) is an expatriate American  jazz drummer. He is related to Les and Larry Elgart.

Elgart was born in Chelsea, Massachusetts. He studied at the Berklee College of Music and was a student of Alan Dawson. In the 1960s he played with Carla Bley, Paul Bley, Marion Brown, Sam Rivers, Lowell Davidson, Mark Levinson, Roswell Rudd, John Tchicai, Jack Walrath and Glenn Ferris. In 1968 he made his recording debut on Mr. Joy, with Paul Bley and Gary Peacock.

He moved to Europe in 1976, settling first in Salzburg, Austria and later in Ulm, Germany. He has played with Karl Berger, Dave Holland, Ed Schuller, and Wayne Darling over the course of the 1980s and 1990s. He was a member of the group Zollsound 4 with Carlo Mombelli, Lee Konitz, and Thomas Zoller. He played in the Sundial Trio with Peter O'Mara from 1982 to 1990. In 1991 he worked with Caoma alongside Ed Schuller, Sigi Finkel, and Tomasz Stanko. Stanko and Elgart also played with Vlatko Kucan in the 1990s. Elgart worked on the Annemarie Roelofs Projekt, alongside Berger, Frank Möbus, Vitold Rek, and Ingrid Sertso.

He has worked as a sideman on recordings by  Leszek Zadlo, Manfred Bründl, Kenny Wheeler, Carlo Mombelli, Charlie Mariano, Arrigo Cappelletti, Franco D'Andrea, Wolfgang Lackerschmid, Claudio Fasoli, Sigi Finkel and Paolino Dalla Porta, and worked with Tim Berne, Barre Phillips, Eddie Gómez, Conny Bauer, Sheila Jordan, David Friedman and Matthias Schubert.

Discography

As leader
 A Life (Mark Levinson, 1976)
 Jazz at Long Wharf (Mark Levinson, 1978)
 Sun Dial (Rst, 1985)
 Iliad (Rst, 1986)
 O'Mara/Darling/Elgart (Core, 1988)

As sideman
With Paul Bley
 Mr. Joy (Limelight, 1968)
 Paul Bley with Gary Peacock (ECM, 1970)
 Turning Point (Improvising Artists, 1975)

With Claudio Fasoli
 Cities (RAM 1993)
 Ten Tributes (RAM 1995)
 Trois Trios (Splasc(H), 1999)

With others
 Franco D'Andrea, Franco D'Andrea Trio (YVP Music 1989)
 Karl Berger, No Man Is an Island (Douglas Music, 1997)
 Kent Carter, Plaything (NoBusiness, 2014)
 Wolfgang Lackerschmid, One More Life (Bhakti, 1992)
 Guenter Lenz, Strict Minimum (Jazzwerkstatt, 2007)
 Charlie Mariano, Somewhere, out there (New Edition, 2013)
 Martin Mull, Martin Mull (Capricorn, 1972)
 Jim Pepper, Polar Bear Stomp (EmArcy, 2003)
 Tomasz Stanko, Caoma (Konnex, 1993)
 Sadao Watanabe, Sadao & Charlie Again (JVC, 2006)
 Eric Watson, The Fool School (AA, 1993)
 Kenny Wheeler, Flutter By, Butterfly (Soul Note, 1987)
 Leszek Zadlo, Breath (Enja, 1989)

References
[ Bill Elgart] at Allmusic

American jazz drummers
Jazz musicians from Massachusetts
People from Chelsea, Massachusetts
1942 births
Living people
20th-century American drummers
American male drummers
20th-century American male musicians
American male jazz musicians
NoBusiness Records artists